The 2022 Canadian Tire National Skating Championships were held on January 6–12, 2022 in Ottawa, Ontario. Medals were awarded in the disciplines of men's singles, women's singles, pairs, and ice dance on the senior, junior, and novice levels. The results were part of the Canadian selection criteria for the 2022 World Championships, the 2022 Four Continents Championships, the 2022 World Junior Championships, and the 2022 Winter Olympics.

Ottawa was announced as the host in February 2021. The city has hosted the event eleven times previously. Competitors qualified at the Skate Canada Challenge in January.

On December 30, 2021, due to the Omicron variant and Ontario COVID-19 public health orders, it was announced that the competition would be held behind closed doors with no spectators, and all tickets refunded. Competitions for the novice level were also postponed to an undetermined future date. The event was later rescheduled for February 26–27 in Calgary, Alberta.

Entries 
A list of entries was posted prior to the competition.

Senior

Junior

Novice

Medal summary

Senior

Junior

Novice

Senior results

Senior men 
Stephen Gogolev withdrew a day prior to the event, due to testing positive for COVID-19.

Senior women

Senior pairs

Senior ice dance

Junior results

Junior men

Junior women

Junior pairs

Junior ice dance

Novice results 
The novice competition was postponed to an unknown future date on December 30, 2021. Skate Canada later announced that the event would be rescheduled for February 26–27 in Calgary, Alberta.

International team selections

Four Continents Championships 
The 2022 Four Continents Championships were held from January 18–23 in Tallinn, Estonia. Teams were selected using the International Teams Selection Criteria. The entire team was named on January 9, 2022.

Olympic Games 
The 2022 Winter Olympics were held from February 4–20 in Beijing, China. Teams were selected using the International Teams Selection Criteria. The entire team was named on January 9, 2022.

World Junior Championships 
Commonly referred to as "Junior Worlds", the 2022 World Junior Championships were held from April 13–17 in Tallinn, Estonia. Teams were selected using the International Teams Selection Criteria. The initial entire team was named on January 14, 2022. Alternates and substitutions have been published by the ISU on March 25, 2022.

The pair team of Homick and Haubrich failed to obtain the Short Program minimum Technical Elements Score by 0.85 points at the 2022 Bavarian Open. Consequently, on February 6, they have been replaced by 4th place holders Panetta and Thrasher, who already met all their TES.

World Championships 
The 2022 World Championships were held from March 21–27 in Montpellier, France. Teams were selected using the International Teams Selection Criteria. The initial entire team was named on January 9, 2022. Alternates and substitutions have been published by the ISU on March 2, 2022.

References

External links 
 

Canadian Figure Skating Championships
Figure skating
Canadian Figure Skating Championships
Canadian Figure Skating Championships